The pie house, sometimes referred to as the Deerfield pie house or the Deerfield skinny house, is a two-story house located in Deerfield, Illinois, United States. It is located at 970 Chestnut Street, and is near the Deerfield Metra station. The beige-sided house was built to fit a narrow lot and has attracted attention due to its unusual shape. The house is not rectangular, but rather trapezoidal, and attained its primary nickname due to its resemblance to the shape of a slice of pie.

The house has gained media attention after being featured in a viral video on the social media platform TikTok in August 2020. Since then, it has been featured on The Tonight Show Starring Jimmy Fallon and has been covered by the Chicago Tribune, both of which have further increased its attention.

Description
The home was built in 2003 on a small, irregularly shaped lot at 970 Chestnut Street in the Chicago suburb of Deerfield. The house is trapezoidal in shape, rather than the traditional rectangular shape, which has inspired its nickname, the "pie house", due to its apparent resemblance to a slice of pie. The triangular lot it sits on measures only , which contributes to the house's unusual shape. Despite outcry from neighbors, the village of Deerfield was not able to force any changes to be made to the design of the house as it met all building codes and was not legally required to be changed in any way. The house is two stories tall, and has a finished basement. The ground level of the home follows an open concept plan. 

An outdoor patio borders the wider end of the house.

Purchases
The home sold on August 6, 2020, with a list price of 269,000 and an eventual purchase price of $260,000. It was listed for rental on Airbnb shortly afterwards, in October 2020. The house was put up for sale again in May 2021 for $300,000; it sold for $295,000 later that same month.

Media attention
At the time the house was up for sale in August 2020, a user named @eli.korns_ on the short-form video-based social media platform TikTok recorded and posted a video of himself examining the house's exterior and showing amazement at its unusual dimensions. This video ended up going viral, receiving over one million views; attracting significant media attention to the house. Since then, the house has been featured on The Tonight Show Starring Jimmy Fallon and has been covered by numerous media outlets, including the Chicago Tribune.

See also
Casa Scaccabarozzi, house with a similar shape and name
 Any of various spite houses, some of which are comically narrow, and also earn neighbors' disapproval

Notes

References

Deerfield, Illinois
Houses in Lake County, Illinois
Buildings and structures completed in 2003